Itiseng Kenneth Morolong (born 17 February 1982) is a South African politician, who was elected as a Member of Parliament for the African National Congress in the 2019 national elections. In March 2023, Morolong was appointed as Deputy Minister in the Presidency.

Background
Morolong was born on 17 February 1982 in Schweizer-Reneke. He matriculated from Itshupeng Secondary School. He is currently studying for a Bachelor of Public Administration through MANCOSA. From 1991 to 1994, he was president of the ANC's young pioneers group. He served as the provincial chairperson of the Congress of South African Students (COSAS) in the North West from 1998 to 2000. He was the regional coordinator of the African National Congress Youth League in the former Bophirima region in 2001/2002. Morolong later served as the chief executive officer of IKM Trading Enterprise from 2008 to 2009. In 2013, he was appointed as the deputy chairperson of the National Youth Development Agency (NDYA) board, an office he held until 2016. In 2017, he was reappointed to the board.

Parliamentary career
For the 2019 national elections Morolong topped the ANC's list in the North West. He was elected to the National Assembly. He served on the  Standing Committee on Appropriations and the Standing Committee on Finance.

National government
During a cabinet reshuffle on 6 March 2023, Morolong was appointed as Deputy Minister in the Presidency.

References

Living people
1982 births
Tswana people
African National Congress politicians
Members of the National Assembly of South Africa